Mohammad Awais (born 25 October 1992) is a Pakistani first-class cricketer who played for Hyderabad.

References

External links
 

1992 births
Living people
Pakistani cricketers
Hyderabad (Pakistan) cricketers
Cricketers from Hyderabad, Sindh